Daniel Denholm (born 26 August 1990) is a Scottish footballer who plays for Stirling Albion as a winger. He played for one season with Livingston and in lower divisions with Forfar Athletic and Arbroath.

Career
Born and raised in Edinburgh where he attended Broughton High School and was a supporter of Heart of Midlothian as a child, Denholm began his footballing career at Edinburgh City, playing for their senior team in the 2009–10 season including in the early rounds of the Scottish Cup. He left in the summer of 2010, signing with Stirling University, where he was already studying for a degree. He was a part of the side which won the East of Scotland Football League, also being selected for the Scottish Universities team.

In July 2012 Denholm signed with Scottish Football League club Forfar Athletic, managed by Dick Campbell. He made his debut for the club on 28 July, starting and scoring in a 3–2 home win over Dunfermline, in the season's Scottish Challenge Cup. He finished the season with 32 appearances and 10 goals.

On 29 May 2013, he signed with Scottish Championship club Livingston. He made his debut for the club on 3 August, in a 3–1 away win over Elgin City, and scored his first goal two weeks later, in a 3–3 home draw against Queen of the South. After thirty appearances and two goals in what he later described as an unhappy year, Denholm left Livingston in May 2014 to rejoin his first senior side Forfar Athletic.

Denholm spent three seasons with Forfar before signing a two-year deal with their Angus rivals Arbroath on 1 June 2017, reuniting with Dick Campbell as manager. After achieving promotion in his second campaign with Arbroath by winning the 2018–19 Scottish League One title, Denholm remained at the same level when he signed for East Fife in summer 2019.

Denholm signed for Stirling Albion in May 2022.

Personal life and media work
Denholm achieved a degree in Sports Studies at the University of Stirling, being accepted on an International Sports Scholarship to combine football with his studies for the final two years of the course; he trained to become a physical education teacher, taking up full-time roles when his professional contract at Livingston ended, working at schools in Edinburgh and Fife Especially in Dunfermline Where he taught for a year 

He began writing an online blog, Lower League Ramblings, in 2018 while playing for Arbroath; BBC Sport later invited him to write an occasional Part-time Player column on the same theme for the Scottish Football section of their website.

Career statistics

References

External links

1990 births
Living people
Footballers from Edinburgh
Scottish footballers
People educated at Broughton High School, Edinburgh
Alumni of the University of Stirling
Association football midfielders
F.C. Edinburgh players
Scottish schoolteachers
Scottish bloggers
University of Stirling F.C. players
Forfar Athletic F.C. players
Livingston F.C. players
Arbroath F.C. players
East Fife F.C. players
Stirling Albion F.C. players
Scottish Football League players
Scottish Professional Football League players